Indonesian National Route 10 is a relatively short road in the national route system that completely lies in the Central Java province, and connects Banyumas on the northern end, with Buntu in the southern end.

Route
Banyumas - Buntu

References
 http://hubdat.dephub.go.id/keputusan-dirjen/tahun-2007/561-keputusan-dirjen-no-sk-930aj/download 
 http://hubdat.dephub.go.id/keputusan-dirjen/tahun-2008/562-peraturan-dirjen-sk-1207aj/download 

Indonesian National Routes
Transport in Central Java